Barka Deh-e Pain (also Romanized as Barkā Deh-ye Pā’īn and Barkādeh-ye Pā’īn; also known as Barkā Deh, Barkeh Deh, Berka-De, Buzgāh Deh, and Pā’īn Maḩalleh-ye Barkādeh) is a village in Belesbeneh Rural District, Kuchesfahan District, Rasht County, Gilan Province, Iran. At the 2006 census, its population was 1,385, in 431 families.

References 

Populated places in Rasht County